Tangdong station, is a station of  Line 21 of the Guangzhou Metro. It started operations on 20 December 2019.

The station has an underground island platform. Platform 1 is for trains heading to Zengcheng Square, whilst platform 2 is for trains heading to Yuancun.

Exits
There are 3 exits, lettered A, B and D. Exit D is accessible. All exits are located on Tai'an North Road.

Gallery

References

Railway stations in China opened in 2019
Guangzhou Metro stations in Tianhe District